Canoe Lake is a lake in the Township of Greater Madawaska in Renfrew County, Ontario, Canada.

There is a second Canoe Lake in Renfrew County that is also part of the Madawaska system, Canoe Lake (Madawaska Valley), that enters the Madawaska via an unnamed creek further upstream.

References

Lakes of Renfrew County